This page shows the results of the Diving Competition for men and women at the 1999 Pan American Games, held from March 11 to March 26, 1999, in Winnipeg, Manitoba, Canada. There were a total number of two events, for both men and women, after the 1m Springboard event was skipped from the Pan American Games.

Men's competition

Men's 3m Springboard

Men's 10m Platform

Women's competition

Women's 3m Springboard

Women's 10m Platform

Medal table

See also
 Diving at the 2000 Summer Olympics

References
 Sports 123

1999
Events at the 1999 Pan American Games
1999 in diving